Thomas McCairns (22 December 1873 – 1932) was an English footballer who scored 109 goals from 199 appearances in the Football League playing for Grimsby Town, Notts County, Lincoln City and Barnsley. He also played for Middlesbrough Ironopolis, Whitby, in the Birmingham & District League and the Western League for Bristol Rovers, in the Southern League for Wellingborough, Queens Park Rangers, and Brighton & Hove Albion, in the South-Eastern League for Southern United, and for Kettering.

References

1873 births
1932 deaths
Footballers from Darlington
English footballers
Association football forwards
Middlesbrough Ironopolis F.C. players
Whitby Town F.C. players
Grimsby Town F.C. players
Bristol Rovers F.C. players
Notts County F.C. players
Lincoln City F.C. players
Barnsley F.C. players
Wellingborough Town F.C. players
Queens Park Rangers F.C. players
Brighton & Hove Albion F.C. players
Southern United F.C. players
Kettering Town F.C. players
English Football League players
Western Football League players
Southern Football League players
English Football League representative players
Date of death missing